Herbert Bunston (15 April 1874 – 27 February 1935) was an English stage and screen actor. He is remembered for his role as Dr. [[John Seward in the Broadway and film versions of Dracula.

Bunston was born in Charmouth and briefly attended Cranleigh School in Surrey. before working as an actor. Bunston emigrated to the United States in 1922. His first Broadway appearance was Arthur Wing Pinero's The Enchanted Cottage in 1923. Other short-running roles in  That Awful Mrs. Eaton! and Simon Called Peter were followed by a critically noticed role in a run of 260 performances of 1925's Young Woodley. On 5 October 1927, Bunston debuted as Dr John Seward in a Broadway production of  Dracula alongside Bela Lugosi.

Bunston's other Broadway credits include Young Woodley (1925), Simon Called Peter (1924), That Awful Mrs. Eaton (1924), The Enchanted Cottage (1923), and Drink (1903).

Bunston's stage success led to a contract with Metro-Goldwyn-Mayer. Between 1929 and 1935 he had mainly character roles in over 30 films, and 1931 he re-created his Broadway role in the film adaptation of Dracula. Bunston died of a heart attack in 1935.

Bunston married Emily Fox Chaffey (1866-1939) in 1898 and they had two children, Margaret, and John.

Partial filmography

 The Last of Mrs. Cheyney (1929) – Lord Elton
 The Lady of Scandal (1930) – Lord Crayle
 Old English (1930) – Mr. Brownbee (uncredited)
 Under Suspicion (1930) – Maj. Manners
 Dracula (1931) – Doctor Seward
 Always Goodbye (1931) – Merson
 The Last Flight (1931) – Man on Train (uncredited)
 I Like Your Nerve (1931) – The Colonel (uncredited)
 Once a Lady (1931) – Roger Fenwick
 Ambassador Bill (1931) – British Ambassador
 Charlie Chan's Chance (1932) – Garrick Enderly
 File 113 (1932) – Fauvel
 Vanity Fair (1932) – Mr. Sedley
 Almost Married (1932) – Lord Laverling (uncredited)
 Smilin' Through (1932) – Minister (uncredited)
 The Monkey's Paw (1933) – Sampson
 Trick for Trick (1933) – Professor King (uncredited)
 Long Lost Father (1934) – The Bishop
 Gambling Lady (1934) – Doctor at Party (uncredited)
 Riptide (1934) – Maj. Bagdall (uncredited)
 Dr. Monica (1934) – Mr. Pettinghill
 The Moonstone (1934) – Sir John Verinder
 The Age of Innocence (1934) – W.J. Letterblair (uncredited)
 Desirable (1934) – Uncle Fred (uncredited)
 British Agent (1934) – First Cabinet Member (uncredited)
 The Richest Girl in the World (1934) – Cavendish
 The Little Minister (1934) – Mr. Carfrae
 Clive of India (1935) – First Director (uncredited)
 A Shot in the Dark (1935) – College President
 After Office Hours (1935) – Barlow – Norwood's Butler
 Les Misérables (1935) – Judge at Favorelles (uncredited)
 Cardinal Richelieu (1935) – Duke of Normandy (final film role)

References/

Coughlin, Jim. "The Supporting Players of Universal's Dracula". Midnight Marquee #49, pp. 63–7.
"Herbert Bunston". Variety (US), 6 March 1935, p62.

External links
 
 

1874 births
1935 deaths
English male stage actors
English male film actors
People educated at Cranleigh School
Actors from Dorset
20th-century English male actors
British expatriate male actors in the United States